The China Africa Research Initiative (CARI) at the Johns Hopkins University School of Advanced International Studies (SAIS) is a research program dedicated to understanding the political and economic aspects of China-Africa relations. Launched in 2014, it is based at the Paul H. Nitze School of Advanced International Studies in Washington, D.C.

SAIS-CARI is focused on producing and promoting high quality, well-researched, and data-backed analysis of the relationship between China and African countries. It also specializes in conducting evidence-based analysis, fostering collaboration, and training future leaders to understand the economic and political dimensions of China-Africa relations and their implications for human security and global development.

The initiative is directed by Dr. Deborah Bräutigam, SAIS Professor of Comparative Politics and director of the International Development Program (IDEV). She is the author of  Will Africa Feed China? (2015),  The Dragon's Gift: The Real Story of China in Africa (2009), and the blog "China in Africa: The Real Story." Both of Bräutigam's books use extensive fieldwork and on-the-ground evidence to challenge conventional wisdom on China's relationship with African countries.

Research 
SAIS-CARI's research areas include Chinese agricultural investments in Africa, Chinese hydropower finance in Africa, the flying geese model in African industries, Chinese loans to Africa, and Chinese FDI and structural transformation in Africa. The research is grounded in both quantitative data collection and analysis as well as qualitative field research. As a result, SAIS-CARI has created several rigorously cross-checked databases on various aspects of Chinese activity in Africa.

Of note, in April 2016, the Initiative launched its exclusive database of Chinese loans to African countries. The findings of this database have been featured in NPR, The Economist, and The New York Times', among other media outlets. As of March 29, 2021, this database is now managed by the Boston University Global Development Policy Center.

In February 2021, CARI also launched its Debt Relief Dashboard, which reports official information about global Chinese debt relief in the COVID-19 era.

Annual conferences 

 2021 – "China’s Overseas Lending in Comparative Perspective," Apr 6–May 18, 2021 (virtual)
Keynotes were Kristen Hopewell (University of British Columbia), on “Clash of Powers: US-China Rivalry in Global Trade Governance”, and Stephen Kaplan (George Washington University), on “Globalizing Patient Capital: The Political Economy of Chinese Finance in the Americas”
2020 – "Strategic Interests, Security Implications: China, Africa, and the Rest," Sep 22–Oct 2, 2020 (virtual)
The 2020 keynote speaker was Prof. Chris Alden, on China's Changing Role in African Security.
2019 – "Catalysts, Competition and Learning: Knowledge, Skills, and Technology Transfer in China-Africa Engagements", April 15–16, 2019
 Presenters discussed aspects including knowledge transfer in entrepreneurship, special economic zones, the manufacturing sector, FDI, and infrastructure.
 2018 – “Matters of State: Politics, Governance, and Agency in China-Africa Engagement”, April 19–20, 2018
 Panels discussed the relationship between China, Africa, and the West, African agency and strategic bargaining, leadership, civil society, and state capacity.
 2016 – "Orient Express: Chinese Infrastructure Engagement in Africa", October 13–14, 2016
 2015 – "Researching China’s Overseas Finance and Aid: What, Why, How, Where and How Much?", April 10, 2015
 2014 – "China’s Agricultural Investment in Africa: 'Land Grabs' or 'Friendship Farms'?", May 16, 2014

SAIS-CARI in the media (selected) 
SAIS-CARI research has been featured in NPR, Financial Times, The New York Times, The Wall Street Journal, The Economist, Bloomberg, The Washington Post, and more.
Chinese Lending to Africa Down on Debt-Default Fears, Study Says, Bloomberg (2021)
The Chinese ‘Debt Trap’ Is a Myth, The Atlantic (2021)
Africa’s First Pandemic Default Tests New Effort to Ease Debt From China, The Wall Street Journal (2020)
The poorest countries may owe less to China than first thought, The Economist, (2020)
Is China the World’s Loan Shark?, The New York Times (2019)
Misdiagnosing the Chinese Infrastructure Push, The American Interest (2019)
Xi's Africa tour an opportunity to fortify Chinese economic ties, Axios (2018)
Deborah Bräutigam on China’s political concerns in Africa, Voice of America (2018)
Donald Trump’s team has questions about China in Africa. Here are answers., The Washington Post (2017)
Will Africa Feed China? Review, Financial Times (2015)
Chinese firms buy, lease far less African farmland than thought - Book, Reuters (2015)

Publications (selected) 

SAIS-CARI publishes policy briefs, working papers, briefing papers, and economic bulletins on a range of topics concerning the growing relationship between China and Africa. The publications can be found on CARI's website.

Policy briefs (selected) 
A Comparative Analysis: Chinese and Indian Exim Bank Finance in Ethiopia (Policy Brief 58/2021)
International Development Lending and Global Value Chains in Africa (Policy Brief 57/2021)
China, Africa, and Debt Distress: Fact and Fiction about Asset Seizures (Policy Brief 47/2020)
Debt Relief with Chinese Characteristics (Policy Brief 46/2020)
Comparing the Determinants of Western and Chinese Commercial Ties With Africa (Policy Brief 38/2019)
The East Africa Shift in Textile and Apparel Manufacturing: China-Africa Strategies and AGOA’s Influence (Policy Brief 25/2018)
The United States and China in Africa: What does the data say? (Policy Brief 18/2017)

Working papers (selected) 
Do Chinese Infrastructure Loans Promote Entrepreneurship in African Countries? (Working Paper 46/May 2021)
Laying the Tracks: The Political Economy of Railway Development in Ethiopia’s Railway Sector and Implications for Technology Transfer (Working Paper 43/February 2021)
China, Africa, and the Rest: Recent Trends in Space Science, Technology, and Satellite Development (Working Paper 38/May 2020)
The Footprint of Chinese Private Security Companies in Africa (Working Paper 35/March 2020)
Lessons from East Asia: Comparing Ethiopia and Vietnam's Early-Stage Special Economic Zone Development (Working Paper 26/April 2019) 
Local Skill Development from China's Engagement in Africa: Comparative Evidence from the Construction Sector in Ghana (Working Paper 22/January 2019)
What kinds of Chinese "Geese" are flying to Africa? Evidence from Chinese manufacturing firms (Working Paper 17/August 2018)
China and uranium: Comparative possibilities for agency in statecraft in Niger and Namibia (Working Paper 11/March 2017)
How do Chinese Contractors Perform in Africa? Evidence from World Bank Projects (Working Paper 03/February 2016)

Briefing papers and economic bulletins (selected) 

 Twenty Years Of Data On China’s Africa Lending (Briefing Paper 04/2021)
 The Path Ahead: The 7th Forum on China-Africa Cooperation (Briefing Paper 01/2018)
 Challenges of and Opportunities from the Commodity Price Slump (Economic Bulletin 01/2017)

Funding 

SAIS-CARI currently receives support from Carnegie Corporation of New York to develop a database to track Chinese finance and investments in Africa; construct and maintain the CARI website; publish newsletters, working papers, and policy briefs; host conferences, roundtables, and workshops; and fund the CARI fellowship program for scholars, journalists, researchers and practitioners.

In the past, SAIS-CARI has also received support through a grant from the UK's Department for International Development and the Economic and Social Research Council (DFID/ESRC) for a project on "evidence-based analysis of technology transfer, linkages, learning, and spillovers associated with Chinese investment in African manufacturing, agribusiness, and construction industries."

See also 
Forum on China–Africa Cooperation
Africa–China relations
Africa–China economic relations

References

External links 
  The China Africa Research Initiative (CARI) official website

Johns Hopkins University
Africa–China relations
2014 establishments in Washington, D.C.